is a Japanese former Nippon Professional Baseball catcher.

References 

1979 births
Living people
Baseball people from Miyagi Prefecture 
Japanese baseball players
Nippon Professional Baseball catchers
Yokohama BayStars players
Yokohama DeNA BayStars players
Japanese baseball coaches
Nippon Professional Baseball coaches